Adarsha Vidyalaya is an English language school located in Sahakar Nagar, Shell Colony, Chembur, Mumbai, India. Established in 1958, it is run by the Kerala Peoples Education Society (KPES). The school is one of the few in Mumbai that teaches the Malayalam language. Tamil and Urdu are also offered. However, students are expected to speak English while in class.

Educational Amenities 
The school has a science lab, computer lab, library, and audio-visual room.

Extracurricular Activities
Adarsha Vidyalaya elects a head boy and head girl every year. The school celebrates Indian Independence Day, Republic Day, Teacher's Day, Children's Day, and Christmas. The institution has participated in interscholastic sports, elocution, science exhibitions, drawing, dance, and various other cultural activities. Adarsha Vidyalaya also publishes a school magazine annually.

See also
 List of schools in Mumbai

References

Educational institutions established in 1958
Schools in Chembur
Education in Mumbai
1958 establishments in Bombay State